Parsons Nabiula (2 January 1930 – 19 February 2005) was a Filipino swimmer. He competed in two events at the 1956 Summer Olympics.

Career
In his early years, Nabiula competed in the Manila-based Private Schools Athletic Association.

Nabiula competed in two swimming events at the 1956 Summer Olympics in Melbourne, Australia representing the Philippines. Nabiula failed to advance from the first round of the men's 200 meter breaststroke after he and Brazilian swimmer, Octávio Mobiglia, were disqualified. They competed in Heat 1, which was contested by seven swimmers.

In the men's 200 meter butterfly event, Nabiula competed in Heat 2 and finished fifth among six swimmers by clocking 3 mins and 3.2 seconds. He only bested Shamsher Khan of India. He failed to progress to the final round by failing to finish among the top eight swimmers of the first round.

References

External links
 

1930 births
2005 deaths
Filipino male swimmers
Olympic swimmers of the Philippines
Swimmers at the 1956 Summer Olympics
Place of birth missing
Asian Games medalists in swimming
Swimmers at the 1954 Asian Games
Asian Games gold medalists for the Philippines
Medalists at the 1954 Asian Games
21st-century Filipino people
20th-century Filipino people